Nosovskoye is a rural locality (a selo) in Tonshalovskoye Rural Settlement, Cherepovetsky District, Vologda Oblast, Russia. The population was 40 as of 2002. There are 2 streets.

Geography 
Bolshoy Dvor is the nearest rural locality.

References 

Rural localities in Cherepovetsky District